HMS Royal Anne Galley was a 42-gun fifth-rate frigate of the Royal Navy. She ran aground and was wrecked during a gale off Lizard Point, Cornwall, while she was travelling to the West Indies. The wreck is a Protected Wreck managed by Historic England.

Construction 
Royal Anne Galley was constructed and launched in 1709 at Woolwich Dockyard. She was completed in 1709. She was named Royal Anne Galley after Anne, Queen of Great Britain, and served from 1709 until her loss in 1721. She had 42 cannons and was the Royal Navy's last oared fighting ship.

Sinking 

On 10 November 1721, HMS Royal Anne Galley was on a voyage from the UK to the West Indies with John Hamilton, 3rd Lord Belhaven and Stenton, the new Governor of Barbados on board, when bad weather forced the ship to return to port in Falmouth. Before they could return, Royal Anne Galley was in the eye of the storm and she was wrecked on the Stag Rocks on Lizard Point, Cornwall. Of the 200 passengers and crew, only two survived the sinking. Lord Belhaven was amongst those killed. It is believed their bodies were buried by locals in Pistil Meadow as they were washed up.

Wreck 
Some artefacts that were raised includes cutlery bearing Lord Belhaven's family crest.

References

External links 

 "Royal Anne" National Heritage List for England
 BBC News: "Royal Anne" shipwreck mystery remains
 Royal Anne Galley Marine Environmental Assessment

1700s ships
Fifth-rate frigates of the Royal Navy
Ships built in Woolwich
Shipwrecks in the English Channel
Maritime incidents in 1721